Bill Nigh(y) or Bill Nye may refer to:

Actors
Bill Nighy (born 1949), British actor (playing a wide variety of film roles)
William Nigh (1881-1955), American filmmaker and actor

Others
Bill Nye (born 1955), American engineer, journalist, and actor (playing scientists)
 Bill Nye, fictional character in 1870 Brett Harte poem "The Heathen Chinee"

See also

Bill Knight (disambiguation)
Bill Nye (disambiguation)
William Nye (disambiguation)